Darsinuyeh (also Romanized as Dārsīnūyeh and Darsinoo’iyeh; also known as Darsīnu) is a village in Derakhtengan Rural District, in the Central District of Kerman County, Kerman Province, Iran. At the 2006 census, its population was 32, in 11 families.

References 

Populated places in Kerman County